"Don't Go Out", also known as "Don't Go Out with Him", is a song written by Radney Foster and Bill Lloyd, and recorded by Foster & Lloyd on their 1987 self-titled debut album. In June 1990, a cover version, titled "Don't Go Out", recorded by American country artists Tanya Tucker and T. Graham Brown was released as the second single from Tucker's album Tennessee Woman. The song reached number 6 on the Billboard Hot Country Singles & Tracks chart.

Content
The song is a duet in which the two singers, who have feelings  for each other, attempt to discourage each other from becoming involved with their love triangle suitors by saying negative things about them.

Chart performance

Year-end charts

References

1987 songs
1990 singles
Tanya Tucker songs
T. Graham Brown songs
Foster & Lloyd songs
Songs written by Radney Foster
Songs written by Bill Lloyd (country musician)
Male–female vocal duets
Capitol Records Nashville singles
Song recordings produced by Jerry Crutchfield